Harvey Francis Thew was a screenwriter in the United States. He worked mostly with Warner Bros. and wrote dozens of screenplays, often as part of a writing team. Some of his screenplays were adaptations. He also worked for MGM and Paramount. He was born in Vernon Center, Minnesota. He died in Los Angeles.

Partial filmography

 The Years of the Locust (1916), co-wrote screenplay
 The Big Sister (1916)
 The American Consul (1917)
 Rimrock Jones (1918)
 The Shuttle (1918)
 The Scarlet Shadow (1919)
 What Am I Bid? (1919)
 Under Crimson Skies (1920)
 The Romance Promoters (1920)
 Just Outside the Door (1921)
 Flaming Barriers (1924), co-wrote screenplay
 Oh, Doctor! (1925)
 Raffles, the Amateur Cracksman (1925)
 The Mad Whirl (1925)
 I'll Show You the Town (1925)
 Siege (1925)
 Take It from Me (1926)
 The Cheerful Fraud (1927)
 Three-Ring Marriage (1928)
 The Street of Illusion (1928)
 Love in the Desert (1929)
 The Sacred Flame (1929)
 Playing Around (1930)
 The Man From Blankley's (1930) 
 The Matrimonial Bed (1930)
 Divorce Among Friends (1930)
 The Mad Genius (1931)
 The Public Enemy (1931)
 The Woman from Monte Carlo (1932)
 The Famous Ferguson Case (1932)
 Two Seconds (1932)
 Silver Dollar (1932)
 Supernatural (1933)
 She Done Him Wrong (1933), adapted from Diamond Lil for Paramount
Terror Aboard (1933)
 Bedside (1934)
 Operator 13 (1934)
 Murder in the Private Car (1934)
 Death on the Diamond (1934)
 The Trail of the Lonesome Pine (1936)
 Dudes Are Pretty People (1942)
 Confessions of a Vice Baron'' (1943)

References

1883 births
1946 deaths
Screenwriters from California
People from Vernon Center, Minnesota
Warner Bros. people
Screenwriters from Minnesota
20th-century American screenwriters